The North East Joint Transport Committee is a special joint committee of the North East Combined Authority and the North of Tyne Combined Authority. It is responsible for public transport policy in Tyne and Wear, County Durham and Northumberland in England. It is the governing body of Nexus, the trading name of the Tyne and Wear Passenger Transport Executive. The inaugural meeting was held on 20 November 2018.

It is a statutory committee, created by part 3 of the Newcastle upon Tyne, North Tyneside and Northumberland Combined Authority (Establishment and Functions) Order 2018. The committee holds the transport powers that would ordinarily be the responsibility of a combined authority or integrated transport authority. Some functions are devolved to Durham County Council and Northumberland County Council and there is a sub-committee for transport policy in Tyne and Wear.

The committee has seven members, with four from the North East Combined Authority and three from the North of Tyne Combined Authority. It is hosted by and accountable to the North East Combined Authority who "hold, manage and account for the finances and staff deployed in relation to the discharge of transport functions".

References

North East England
Transport organizations